Lerd may refer to:
 Iranian film
 Lerd a village in Ardabil,Iran
 Persian film

Lord (meaning the deposition of wine or sometimes other liquids) is a 2016 film written, produced and directed by Mohammad Rasulov.
This film is the sixth film of Mohammad Rasoulov and one of the official productions of Iranian cinema, in the winter of 2016, after receiving a production license, went in front of the camera, but was excluded from the 35th Fajr Film Festival.

synopsis

Reza is away from the city and works on a farm in Gilan. He lives a quiet life with his family in nature. The farm administration is facing problems. Reza tries to overcome these problems by avoiding the chain of corrupt local relations. 

director

This film is the sixth film of Mohammad Rasoulov and one of the official productions of Iranian cinema

Actors

Reza Akhlaghi Rad - Soodabeh Beizai - Nasim Adabi - Bagher Yekta - Misagh Zare - Zeinab Shabani - Jila Shahi - Mehdi Mehraban - Arash Ashadad - 

Honors

At the 70th Cannes Film Festival, Lord won the main prize for a kind of look. 
Lerd was applauded at the Belgian Film Festival.